Think Blue Linux (sometimes ThinkBlue Linux) was a port of Linux to IBM S/390 (later, zSeries) mainframe computers, done by the Millenux subsidiary of German company Thinking Objects Software GmbH.

The distribution consisted primarily of a collection of Red Hat Linux 6.1 packages (or RPMs) on top of IBM's port of the Linux kernel. Distribution of the product ceased on February 16, 2006.

References

LinuxToday article
Heise article (German)

External links 
linux.s390.org aka linux.zseries.org is the official ThinkBlue/64 website
Thinking Objects Software GmbH (German)
Millenux (subsidiary of Thinking Objects) Linux for zSeries product page (German)

Discontinued Linux distributions
Linux distributions